Eagle Elementary District 45 is a school district in Greenlee County, Arizona.

References

School districts in Greenlee County, Arizona